Hivju is a Norwegian surname. Notable people with the surname include:

Erik Hivju (born 1947), Norwegian actor
Gry Molvær Hivju (born 1970), Norwegian journalist, director, producer, and screenwriter
Kristofer Hivju (born 1978), Norwegian actor

Norwegian-language surnames